Duke Hui of Qi (died 599 BC) was from 608 to 599 BC ruler of the State of Qi, a major power during the Spring and Autumn period of ancient China.  His personal name was Lü Yuan (呂元), ancestral name Jiang (姜), and Duke Hui was his posthumous title.  He was known as Prince Yuan before ascending the throne.

Accession to the throne
Duke Hui's father was Duke Huan of Qi, who was the first of the Five Hegemons, the most powerful rulers of the Spring and Autumn period.  Duke Huan had at least three main wives who bore no sons, six favoured concubines, and more than ten sons.  Duke Hui was then known as Prince Yuan, and his mother was the younger Wey Ji, one of two princesses of the State of Wey who were among Duke Huan's favoured concubines.  Five other sons of Duke Huan also contended for the throne: Prince Wukui, Crown Prince Zhao (later Duke Xiao), Prince Pan (later Duke Zhao), Prince Shangren (later Duke Yì), and Prince Yong.

When Duke Huan died in the tenth month of 643 BC, the six princes fought one another for the throne. Wukui, the son of the elder Wey Ji, prevailed at first, but was killed three months later and replaced by Duke Xiao.  Duke Xiao died after ten years of reign, and was succeeded by Duke Zhao whose supporters killed Duke Xiao's son.  When Duke Zhao died in 613 BC, his son She ascended the throne, but was soon murdered by his uncle Duke Yì.

Duke Yì reigned for four years before being killed by Bing Chu (邴歜) and Yan Zhi (閻職) in 609 BC.  The ministers of Qi deposed Duke Yì's son and installed his brother Prince Yuan, who was then exiled in the State of Wey, on the throne.  Prince Yuan, posthumously known as Duke Hui of Qi, was the last of the five sons of Duke Huan to ascend the Qi throne.

Reign and succession
In 607 BC, the second year of Duke Hui's reign, the Long Di tribes invaded Qi.  Qi general Wangzi Chengfu (王子城父) defeated the invaders and killed their leader Rongru (榮如).

Duke Hui reigned for ten years and died in 599 BC.  He was succeeded by his son Wuye, Duke Qing of Qi.  Duke Hui favoured the official Cui Zhu (崔杼).  After Duke Hui's death the powerful Gao and Guo clans of Qi expelled Cui, who fled to the State of Wey.  Cui would later return to Qi and cause great turmoil in the state.

Family
Wives:
 Xiao Tong Shu Zi, of the Zi clan, the mother of Prince Wuye

Sons:
 Prince Wuye (d. 582 BC), ruled as Duke Qing of Qi from 598–582 BC

Ancestry

References

Year of birth unknown
Monarchs of Qi (state)
7th-century BC Chinese monarchs
6th-century BC Chinese monarchs
599 BC deaths